Splintered was a British experimental rock group active between 1991 and 1998.

History
Splintered was formed when Fourth Dimension Records and Grim Humour fanzine's Richard (Richo) Johnson's previous band, Playground, fell apart in 1989.  With other ex-Playground members Paul Wright (bass), Paul Dudeney (drums, metal percussion) and James Machin (guitar) & Steven Wright (FX`S).
Splintered sought to push the previous band's noise excursions to denser realms. They picked up interest from several underground record labels and garnered some attention as part of a subculture of industrial and experimental groups in the UK, including Terminal Cheesecake, Skullflower, Ramleh, Loop and Godflesh.

The band uses an array of instruments, samples, multi-layered guitars, electronics, powerful rhythms and often submerged, shouted vocals.  Other members who joined the group included Steve Pittis (Band of Pain, Dirter Promotions) and Colin Bradley (Dual).  The first album featured Stefx (Headbutt) on drums when Paul Dudeney failed to make the recording sessions.

In 1997, James and the two Pauls decided they needed a break and could not face a European tour arranged for the same year. Richo, aided by Colin Bradley (tabletop guitar/electronics), assembled a final line-up for this that consisted of Stuart Carter (Heroin, Sarcasm, The Fields of Hay) on bass, Hassni Malik (dROME, The Vitamin B12) on guitar and James Hodson (later of Faust) on drums, percussion and flute. Once over, and following the release of another album in 1998, the group once again ground to a halt and during the course of the next two years got replaced by a new group, Theme, which consisted of Richo, Stuart and Hassni. Theme continue to this day and have had numerous albums out and have themselves collaborated with Jean-Hervé Peron of Faust.

Splintered reactivated in 2013 with the release of a 2CD collection of rarities, singles and previously unreleased material on Finland's Totuuden Sarvi Levyt label. Since then, the original lineup of the group (augmented by Stuart Carter) have played live a few times in London and Poland. More live work is planned to promote the reissue of 1996's 'Moraine' album on Fourth Dimension Records in late 2017. This reissue also features new recordings based on the original two lengthy songs constituting the first LP.

Side projects
Splintered were involved in several other projects along the way as well. These were usually activated by Richo and Steve Pittis, plus often involved other members of the group as well as others. These projects were Husk, A.S.P., Slugbait and Band Of Pain. All of them had releases out, on both Steve Pittis and Richo's respective labels and others such as Ralf Wehowsky's Selektion, Meeuw Muzak and Cold Spring Records. Band Of Pain then became the main concern for Steve Pittis and continues to record to this day, with a new album released in 2017.

Discography

Albums
Parapraxis LP/CD/MC (Intellectual Convulsion, SPASM4, France, 1992). 
The Judas Cradle CD (Dirter Promotions, DPROMCD17, 1993). 
Noumena LP (Dirter Promotions, DPROMLP33, 1995). 
Moraine LP (Suggestion/No Risk No Fun, SUG013, Germany). Includes Jim O'Rourke source material.
Splintered/RLW eponymous CD (Black Rose Recordings, BRCD96-1005, 1996). Collaborative album with Germany's Ralf Wehowsky.
Noumena CD reissue (Amanita, Suggestion, Fourth Dimension, AMA41/SUG16/FDCD60, France/Germany/UK, 1998). 
"Turned Inside Out" 2CD (Totuuden Sarvi Levyt, Finland, 2013)

Singles
"Nothing" (Shock, SX09, 1990). 
"Pigmeat" (Remix) (Fourth Dimension, FDS26, 1991). 
"Mouth Clamp" (Remix) (Fourth Dimension, FDS25, 1991). Split single with Cindytalk, limited to 500 hand numbered copies and sold with Richo's Grim Humour magazine. 
"Link" e.p. (Dying Earth Europe, DE001, 1991). 
"Head Wound" (Drunken Fish, DF01, USA, 1992). Split with Back Off Cupid.
"Skin Shift" split CD single (Noiseville, N31, USA, 1992). Split with Headbutt.
"Godsend" (Dirter Promotions, 7DPROMS13, 1993). 
"Hilt" (Pitsbull, PBR009, Belgium, 1994).
"Comparatively Mainstream" e.p. (Aquese Recordings, AQR703, 1994). Features Death In June/NER affiliates Somewhere In Europe on 'S.H.C.'
"Kill the Body..." (live) (Fourth Dimension, FDS29, 1994). Split release with No Tomorrow Charlie. 
"Smokescreen" e.p. (Suggestion, 009, Germany, 1996). 
"Martian Sunset" split-10 (Fourth Dimension, FDTEN53, 1997).

External links
http://www.adverse-effect.co.uk
http://www.lumbertontrading.com

British experimental musical groups
British industrial music groups